Ghassan Skaff is a Lebanese politician and neurosurgeon. He is a member of the Parliament of Lebanon from Rachaya district and was a candidate in the 2022 Deputy Speaker of the Lebanese Parliament election. Skaff is a professor and chief of neurosurgery at the American University of Beirut.

See also 

 List of members of the 2022-2026 Lebanese Parliament

References 

Living people
Progressive Socialist Party politicians
Members of the Parliament of Lebanon
21st-century Lebanese politicians
Year of birth missing (living people)
Lebanese neurosurgeons